"Feel Good Time" is a song by American singer Pink featuring William Orbit. It was released on May 27, 2003, as the lead single from the soundtrack of the 2003 film Charlie's Angels: Full Throttle. It was later included on the international edition of her third studio album Try This. The single peaked at number 60 on the U.S. Billboard Hot 100 and number three on the UK Singles Chart, and has been certified gold by the Australian Recording Industry Association.

The song was originally written by and recorded by Beck and William Orbit with the intention of being a Beck track, but after Pink wanted to cover the song, Beck gave the song to her. Beck's vocals and a guitar were removed and replaced with Pink's vocals. Beck's original was later posted on Orbit's website. "Feel Good Time" uses audio samples from "Fresh-Garbage" by Spirit.

"Feel Good Time" was nominated for the 2004 Grammy Award for Best Pop Collaboration with Vocals. Nancy and the Boys covered the song on the 2003 happy hardcore compilation album Speed SFX.

Critical response
Stylus Magazine wrote a favorable review: "And then, there's the brilliance of 'Feel Good Time' – depending on whom you believe, either stolen from or written for by Beck – ostensibly/unofficially the first single from Try This. This 'association' with Beck serves as something of a touchstone for the album; forget for a moment the white-male-pain and subdued arrangements of Mutations and Sea Change and remember instead the schizoid pastiche spectaculars of Midnite Vultures. What the album occasionally lacks in coherence or narrative it more than makes up for in moments of pop brilliance, the kind of eccentric pop magic that's not been seen since the glory days of Cyndi Lauper (I'm sure it's no accident that P!nk looks alarmingly like The Unusual One in the liner photos)".

Track listings

 UK CD single
 "Feel Good Time" (single version) – 3:42
 "Feel Good Time" (D-Bop's Full Throttle mix) – 7:58
 "Feel Good Time" (Boris & Beck's Massive vocal) – 8:05

 UK cassette single
 "Feel Good Time" (single version) – 3:42
 "Feel Good Time" (Boris & Beck's Massive radio edit) – 3:51

 Australian CD single
 "Feel Good Time" (single version) – 3:57
 "Feel Good Time" (Boris & Beck's massive vocal) – 8:05
 "Feel Good Time" (Boris & Beck's Feel Good dub) – 7:40

 European CD single
 "Feel Good Time" (single version) – 3:42
 "Feel Good Time" (D-Bop's Full Throttle mix) – 7:58

 German CD single
 "Feel Good Time" (single version) – 3:42
 "Feel Good Time" (D-Bop's Full Throttle mix) – 7:58
 "Feel Good Time" (Boris & Beck's massive vocal) – 8:05
 "Feel Good Time" (Boris & Beck's Feel Good dub) – 7:40

Charts

Weekly charts

Year-end charts

Certifications

Release history

References

2003 songs
2003 singles
Pink (singer) songs
William Orbit songs
Music videos directed by Dave Meyers (director)
Songs written for films
Songs written by Beck
Songs written by William Orbit
Song recordings produced by William Orbit
Columbia Records singles
Charlie's Angels (franchise)
Dance-punk songs
Psychedelic rock songs
Songs written by Jay Ferguson (American musician)